Top Chess Engine Championship, formerly known as Thoresen Chess Engines Competition (TCEC or nTCEC), is a computer chess tournament that has been run since 2010. It was organized, directed, and hosted by Martin Thoresen until the end of Season 6; from Season 7 onward it has been organized by Chessdom. It is often regarded as the Unofficial World Computer Chess Championship because of its strong participant line-up and long time-control matches on high-end hardware, giving rise to very high-class chess. The tournament has attracted nearly all the top engines compared to the World Computer Chess Championship.

After a short break in 2012, TCEC was restarted in early 2013 (as nTCEC) and is currently active (renamed as TCEC in early 2014) with 24/7 live broadcasts of chess matches on its website. 

Since season 5, TCEC has been sponsored by Chessdom Arena.

Overview

Basic structure of competition
The TCEC competition is divided into seasons, where each season happens over a course of a few months, with matches played round-the-clock and broadcast live over the internet. Each season is divided into several tournaments: a Leagues Season, a Cup, a Swiss tournament, a Fischer Random Chess tournament. Additionally, seasons contain various bonus contests, like the 'Viewer Submitted Opening Bonus'.

Prior to season 21, there was originally one tournament in each season. This tournament consisted of several qualifying stages and one "superfinal", and the winner of the superfinal is called the "TCEC Grand Champion" until the next season. Prior to season 11, the tournament used a cup format, while starting in Season 11, the tournament used a division system. Starting in season 13, there was also a cup tournament consisting of the top 32 engines in the main tournament, resulting in a 5-round single elimination tournament.

Engine settings/characteristics

Pondering is set to off. All engines run on mostly the same hardware and use the same opening book, which is set by the organizers and changed in every stage. Large pages are disabled, but access to various endgame tablebases is permitted. Engines are allowed updates between stages; if there is a critical play-limiting bug, they are also allowed to be updated once during the stage. In previous seasons, if an engine crashes 3 times in one event, it is disqualified to avoid distorting the results for the other engines; however starting in TCEC Season 20, an engine is allowed to crash as many times as possible without being disqualified from the current event; however, the engine will still be disqualified from future events unless the crash is fixed. TCEC generates an Elo rating list from the matches played during the tournament. An initial rating is given to any new participant based on its rating in other chess engine rating lists.

Criteria for entering the competition

There is no definite criterion for entering into the competition, other than inviting the top participants under active development from various rating lists which can run on their Linux platform. Originally, TCEC used Windows instead of Linux. In addition, either XBoard or UCI protocol are required to participate.  

Usually chess engines that support multiprocessor mode are preferred (8-cores or higher), and engines in active development are given preference. Since TCEC 12, engines like LCZero which use GPUs for neural processing were supported. 

Initially, the list of participants was personally chosen by Thoresen before the start of a season. His stated goal was to include "every major engine that is not a direct clone".  In TCEC 13, DeusX was banned due to being a clone of Leela, and in TCEC 20, Houdini, Fire, Rybka (engine in Fritz up to TCEC 16), and Critter were banned due to allegations of plagiarism.

Tournament results

TCEC Seasons

1 Houdini has been disqualified since season 20 and its results in previous seasons have been nullified.
2 Originally named "nTCEC Season 1".
3 Originally named "nTCEC Season 2".
4 Season 7 did not use endgame table bases at all and Stage two did not use opening books either.

TCEC Cups

TCEC Swiss

TCEC FRC (Fischer Random Chess)

TCEC DFRC (double Fischer Random Chess) 
In DFRC, the start positions of the pieces are randomized independently for both players.

Other TCEC tournaments

1 Double round robin tournament.

See also 
 Chess engine
 Computer chess
 Chess.com Computer Chess Championship
 World Computer Chess Championship
 World Computer Speed Chess Championship
 Dutch Open Computer Chess Championship
 North American Computer Chess Championship

References

Sources
 Additional information for Season 4
 Additional information for Season 5
 
 
 TCEC Season 12 report, by Guy Haworth and Nelson Hernandez
 TCEC Season 13 report, by Guy Haworth and Nelson Hernandez

External links
 TCEC Live Games Page
 
 TCEC games archive - Scroll down and click on Seasons.
 chessdom.org with an overview of TCEC's websites

 
Computer chess competitions
World championships in chess
Recurring events established in 2010